Rita Akoto Coker (born 1953) is a Ghanaian American writer, primarily of romance novels. She has published five books, including the 2001 novel Serwah, the Saga of an African Princess. Her father, Baffour Osei Akoto, was the founder of Ghana's National Liberation Movement.

Biography 
Rita Akoto Coker was born in 1953 in Ghana. Her parents were Helena Osei Akoto and Baffour Osei Akoto, a prominent member of the pre-independence National Liberation Movement and a chief linguist at the Manhyia Palace. Her brother, Owusu Afriyie Akoto, is a Ghanaian politician with the New Patriotic Party.

Coker migrated to the United States, where she lives in Chicago and works as a marketing consultant. She began writing romance novels, publishing her first book, Serwah: The Saga of an African Princess, in 2001. She has since released four more books, including The Lost Princess and its sequel, Fate's Promise. While Coker is based in the U.S., her books have been primarily released by Ghanaian publishers including Afram Publications and Kwadwoan Publishing Company.

She has also regularly contributed to the Chicago-based magazine African Spectrum.

Selected works 

 Serwah: The Saga of an African Princess (2001)
 The Golden Staff (2013)
 The Lost Princess (2014)
 Boarding Time (2015)
 Fate's Promise: Sequel to the Lost Princess (2015)

References 

1953 births
Living people
Ghanaian women writers
Ghanaian women novelists
American women novelists
African-American women writers
American romantic fiction writers
Ghanaian romantic fiction writers
African-American novelists
21st-century African-American people
20th-century African-American people
20th-century African-American women
21st-century African-American women